In organic chemistry, an alkynol (shortened to ynol) is an alkyne with a hydroxyl group affixed to one of the two carbon atoms composing the triple bond.  The deprotonated anions of ynols are known as ynolates.  An ynol with hydroxyl groups on both sides of its triple bond is known as an ynediol; only one ynediol, acetylenediol, exists.

Ynolates 

Ynolates are chemical compounds with a negatively charged oxygen atom attached to an alkyne functionality. They were first synthesized in 1975 by Schöllkopf and Hoppe via the n-butyllithium fragmentation of 3,4-diphenylisoxazole.

Synthetically, they behave as ketene precursors or synthons.

Ynol–ketene tautomerism 
Ynols can interconvert with ketenes, much like enols can with aldehydes and ketones.  The ynol tautomer is usually unstable, does not survive long, and changes into the ketene. This is because oxygen is more electronegative than carbon and thus forms stronger bonds.  For instance, ethynol quickly interconverts with ethenone:

See also 
 Thioynol

References